Big Top is a children's television show that aired on CBS from July 1, 1950 to 1957. The cast included Ed McMahon, Johnny Carson's future sidekick, as Ed the Clown and America's Most Muscular Man Dan Lurie as "Sealtest Dan The Muscle Man". The program originated live from the 32nd St. and Lancaster Ave. Philadelphia Armory.

The series debuted on July 1, 1950, and ran at 7:00 p.m. Eastern Time on Friday until September 1950, when it moved to 6:30 p.m. Eastern on Friday, where it remained through January 6, 1951. It then moved to Saturday at noon, where it remained through the end of its run in 1957.

References

External links
 

1950s American children's television series
1950 American television series debuts
1957 American television series endings
American live television series
CBS original programming
Television shows set in New Jersey